Rötkö is a Finnish surname. Notable people with the surname include:

 Iivari Rötkö (1893–1957), Finnish long-distance runner
 Jalmari Rötkö (1892–1938), Finnish laborer and politician

Finnish-language surnames